Sema Salur is a Turkish-American mathematician, currently serving as a Professor of Mathematics at the University of Rochester. She was awarded the Ruth I. Michler Memorial Prize for 2014–2015, a prize intended to give a recently promoted associate professor a year-long fellowship at Cornell University; and has been the recipient of a National Science Foundation Research Award beginning in 2017. She specialises in the "geometry and topology of the moduli spaces of calibrated submanifolds inside Calabi–Yau, G2 and Spin(7) manifolds", which are important to certain aspects of string theory and M-theory in physics, theories that attempt to unite gravity, electromagnetism, and the strong and weak nuclear forces into one coherent Theory of Everything.

Education
 1993: B.S. in Mathematics, Boğaziçi University, Turkey.
 2000: PhD in Mathematics, Michigan State University

References

Year of birth missing (living people)
Living people
21st-century American mathematicians
American people of Turkish descent
American women mathematicians
Turkish mathematicians
Turkish women scientists
Boğaziçi University alumni
Michigan State University alumni
University of Rochester faculty
21st-century women mathematicians
21st-century American women